Ohtsu Dam is a gravity dam located in Gunma Prefecture in Japan. The dam is used for power production. The catchment area of the dam is 451 km2. The dam impounds about 4  ha of land when full and can store 108 thousand cubic meters of water. The construction of the dam was started on 1928 and completed in 1931.

References

Dams in Gunma Prefecture